The Supergrass is a 1985 British comedy film directed by Peter Richardson, (who also plays a major role) who also wrote the screenplay with Pete Richens. The film stars Adrian Edmondson, Jennifer Saunders, Dawn French, Keith Allen, Nigel Planer, Alexei Sayle, Ronald Allen, and Robbie Coltrane. The Supergrass was the first feature-length film by the 1980s alternative comedy group The Comic Strip.

The soundtrack to the film featured original music from Keith Tippett, plus music from P. P. Arnold, Grace Jones, and Bob Marley, among others.

Plot
After returning from a holiday in the West Country, Dennis Carter (Adrian Edmondson) tries to impress a girl by untruthfully boasting of being a drug smuggler. The girl is unimpressed; however, he is overheard by the police, who persuade him to become a supergrass and inform on his associates. The more Dennis lies, the bigger the hole he digs for himself.

Cast
 Adrian Edmondson as Dennis Carter
 Jennifer Saunders as Lesley Reynolds
 Peter Richardson as Harvey Duncan
 Robbie Coltrane as Det. Sgt. Troy
 Nigel Planer as Gunter
 Keith Allen as Wong
 Dawn French as Andrea
 Daniel Peacock as Jim Jarvis
 Ronald Allen as Commander Robertson
 Alexei Sayle as Motorbike Cop
 Michael Elphick as Constable Collins
 Marika Rivera as Bed and Breakfast Landlady
 Al Pillay as Mary
 Kevin Allen as Shop Assistant

Versions
The version of the film initially released in the cinema ran 107 minutes, which was subsequently released on VHS running to 103, due to PAL speed-up.

The film was screened by Channel 4 on 13 March 1988, as a prelude to the fourth series of The Comic Strip Presents, but this was a version cut down to ninety three minutes and twenty six seconds, equivalent to ninety seven minutes and twenty seconds in the cinema, so missing some nine minutes and forty nine seconds. All subsequent VHS and DVD releases, included the "complete" Comic Strip box set, use the shorter/cut down version.

References

External links

1985 films
1985 comedy films
1985 directorial debut films
1980s police comedy films
1980s police procedural films
British comedy films
British police films
The Comic Strip
1980s English-language films
Films directed by Peter Richardson (British director)
1980s British films